Hilliardiella is a genus of flowering plants belonging to the family Asteraceae.

Its native range is Tropical and southern Africa. It is found in the countries of Angola, Botswana, Burkina, Burundi, Cameroon, Central African Republic, Congo, DRC, Eswatini, Ethiopia, Gabon, Ghana, Guinea, Ivory Coast, Kenya, Lesotho, Malawi, Mali, Mozambique, Namibia, Nigeria, Rwanda, Sudan, Tanzania, Zambia, Zimbabwe and South Africa (within the regions of Cape Provinces, Free State, KwaZulu-Natal and Northern Provinces).

The genus name of Hilliardiella is in honour of Olive Mary Hilliard (b. 1925), a noted South African botanist and taxonomist.
It was first described and published in Proc. Biol. Soc. Washington Vol.112 on page 229 in 1999.

Species
According to Kew:
Hilliardiella aristata 
Hilliardiella calyculata 
Hilliardiella capensis 
Hilliardiella elaeagnoides 
Hilliardiella flanaganii 
Hilliardiella hirsuta 
Hilliardiella nudicaulis 
Hilliardiella oligocephala 
Hilliardiella smithiana 
Hilliardiella sutherlandii

References

Asteraceae
Asteraceae genera
Plants described in 1999
Flora of South Africa
Flora of South Tropical Africa
Flora of West-Central Tropical Africa
Flora of West Tropical Africa